Rhodogune (2nd century BCE)  was a queen of the Seleucid Empire by marriage to Demetrius II Nicator. She was the daughter of the Parthian king Mithridates I (171 BCE-132 BCE), and sister of Phraates II (ruled 132 BCE-127 BCE).

Life

In 138 BCE Rhodogune married Seleucid King Demetrius II Nicator (ruled 146-139 BCE, 129-126 BCE). They were kept by her brother in Hyrcania on the shores of the Caspian Sea, during which time they had several children. During their marriage, Demetrius was temporarily a hostage in the Parthian court after an ill-fated campaign in Babylonia.

Polyaenus wrote that Rhodogune, informed of a revolt while preparing for a bath, vowed not to bathe or brush her hair until the revolt was quashed. She immediately went into battle, riding out to the head of her army. She defeated the rebels, and was depicted thereafter on seals of the kings of Persia with long, disheveled hair because of her adherence to her vow. This incident is also mentioned in the anonymously written Tractatus de mulieribus, which elaborates further on the story, describing her as being depicted with a golden statue showing her hair half-braided, half unbraided.

She was presumably abandoned in 129 BCE when Demetrius, after numerous failed attempts to escape from Parthia, was dispatched back to Antioch during the invasion of Parthia by Demetrius's brother, Antiochus VII Sidetes.

References

Sources 
 

2nd-century BC births
2nd-century BC Iranian people
2nd-century BC women
Seleucid royal consorts
Parthian princesses
Women in ancient Near Eastern warfare
Year of death unknown